The Historical Dictionaries are a series of encyclopedic dictionaries published by Rowman & Littlefield that runs to hundreds of volumes. The first volumes in the series were published by Scarecrow Press from 1967 and were organised by country and continent, but the series has since expanded into a wide range of cultural and political topics. The dictionaries are arranged using a common structure and most have a single author. They seek to provide the historical context for current events.

Background
Scarecrow Press was founded by Ralph R. Shaw in 1950 to show that scholarly books could be published on a tight budget. One of its editors described it as a "bare-bones, quick-turnaround publisher which produced books for librarians and scholars. There were no book jackets, the covers were fairly ordinary, and the typesetting was not justified."

History
The first books in the Historical Dictionary series were Latin American country volumes published in 1967. African and Asian countries followed in the 1970s, and lastly, European and Oceanic countries. Later the series expanded into areas such as culture, religion, and political philosophy. There is a complementary series of Area Bibliographies.

Most of the dictionaries have a single author, a practice described as "highly unusual" in dictionary compilation, and Jon Woronoff, editor of the Asian series, has described the difficulty of finding suitable authors for some of the smaller countries, which meant that the African series, for instance, took 25 years to complete. Once published, however, the volumes on the difficult countries potentially had more impact than those for which similar works already existed.

The Scarecrow Press imprint was subsequently owned by Grolier and is now owned by Rowman & Littlefield. Selected volumes in the series are available in paperback as "A to Z Guides".

Content
The dictionaries tend to follow a uniform format of a chronology, introduction, the historical dictionary, and a bibliography with supplementary material such as maps, abbreviations, place name changes, or notes on language according to the subject. The main section is the historical dictionary which covers events, people and places, and additional topics appropriate to the subject. The bibliographies are organised by subject and may range from 50 to 100 pages. Jon Woronoff has described the philosophy of the series as being to focus on current events with the historical content in the books limited to that necessary to understand those events. Other historical material is relegated to separate volumes on ancient history.

Criticism
In his 1980 review article of the African volumes, David C. Tambo noted that the Historical Dictionaries had been subject to an unusually high level of criticism for a reference series. While librarians had lauded the works for filling a long-standing gap in the scholarly literature, academics complained about poor editorial choices, uneven quality, and a lack of factual accuracy. These failings were described as particularly regrettable where the volume covered a niche area for which a competing volume might never be produced. Tambo attributed the unevenness in quality to the practice of the publishers of using a single author for each volume, who often was not an historian, possibly in an attempt to save money. He concluded that although there was a need to collate this sort of material in one place, the African volumes reviewed had not met that need.

Subjects
As of June 2019, dictionaries are published on the following subjects:

 Africa
 The Americas
 Ancient Civilizations and Historical Eras
 Asia, Oceania, and the Middle East
 Cities, States, and Regions
 Diplomacy and Foreign Relations
 Discovery and Exploration
 Europe
 Intelligence and Counter-Intelligence
 International Organizations
 Literature and the Arts
 Peoples and Cultures
 Professions and Industries
 Religions, Philosophies, and Movements Series
 Sports
 U.S. Politics and Political Eras
 War, Revolution, and Civil Unrest
 Women in the World

See also
 Historical dictionary (a dictionary of word meanings on a historical basis)
 List of Scarecrow Press historical dictionaries

References 

1967 establishments in the United States
Series of history books
Encyclopedias of history
English-language encyclopedias
Rowman & Littlefield books
Historical dictionaries